Part Eleven (Part XI) of the Constitution of Albania is the eleventh of eighteen parts. Titled Referendum, it consists of 3 articles.

Referendum

References

11